Matthew Wright (born 14 December 1989) is a former professional Australian rules footballer who played for the  Adelaide and the Carlton Football Club in the Australian Football League (AFL).

Early life
Two years prior to being drafted, Wright fractured his skull when he was hit by a glass bottle at a party.

AFL career
Wright played his first AFL game in 2011 against  in Showdown XXX, replacing Richard Tambling who had injured his ankle in a collision at training.  He was named as the substitute player and was on the bench until the third quarter.  After being dropped back to North Adelaide the following week, he was recalled to the Adelaide side in round six and maintained his position in the senior team for the rest of the season. At the end of 2011, he was elevated to Adelaide's senior list.

In 2012 Wright worked his way into the side early in the season and was a regular in an Adelaide side that made the preliminary final, used as a midfielder/forward and occasional run-with player. He averaged 20 disposals for the season, and in Round 20 against , he amassed a career-high 37 disposals.

After wearing the number 47 jumper for his first two seasons, Wright switched to the number 11 jumper for the 2013 season. Wright returned to form in 2014, playing 20 games, kicking 14 goals and averaging nearly 19 possessions. Wright was delisted by Adelaide in October 2015.

He played all 22 games for Carlton in the 2016 season, primarily as a small forward, and was the Blues' leading goalkicker for the season with 22 goals, including hauls of three goals in the first and last rounds of the year.
In his Second season at Carlton, he bettered his goal tally by 8, kicking 30 goals in 22 games in the 2017 AFL season. Altogether, Wright played 65 of a possible 66 games in three seasons for Carlton, and kicked 73 goals. He retired from AFL football following the 2018 season to pursue a coaching career back in South Australia.

Since 2019 Wright has been a development coach at the Adelaide Crows, and has also been captain of the club's SANFL team, most recently being re-appointed to both roles for the 2021 season.

Statistics
 Statistics are correct to end of the 2017 season

|- style="background:#eaeaea;"
! scope="row" style="text-align:center" | 2011
| style="text-align:center" | 
| 47 || 19 || 18 || 8 || 146 || 125 || 271 || 62 || 66 || 1.0 || 0.4 || 7.7 || 6.6 || 14.3 || 3.3 || 3.5
|- 
! scope="row" style="text-align:center" | 2012
| style="text-align:center" | 
| 47 || 22 || 15 || 10 || 230 || 215 || 445 || 91 || 90 || 0.7 || 0.5 || 10.5 || 9.8 || 20.2 || 4.1 || 4.1
|- style="background:#eaeaea;"
! scope="row" style="text-align:center" | 2013
| style="text-align:center" | 
| 11 || 17 || 11 || 3 || 146 || 132 || 278 || 72 || 44 || 0.7 || 0.2 || 8.6 || 7.8 || 16.4 || 4.2 || 2.6
|- 
! scope="row" style="text-align:center" | 2014
| style="text-align:center" | 
| 11 || 20 || 14 || 8 || 224 || 150 || 374 || 89 || 68 || 0.7 || 0.4 || 11.2 || 7.5 || 18.7 || 4.5 || 3.4
|- style="background:#eaeaea;"
! scope="row" style="text-align:center" | 2015
| style="text-align:center" | 
| 11 || 16 || 5 || 4 || 143 || 86 || 229 || 43 || 38 || 0.3 || 0.3 || 8.9 || 5.4 || 14.3 || 2.7 || 2.4
|- 
! scope="row" style="text-align:center" | 2016
| style="text-align:center" | 
| 46 || 22 || 22 || 10 || 262 || 188 || 450 || 80 || 82 || 1.0 || 0.5 || 11.9 || 8.6 || 20.5 || 3.6 || 3.7
|- style="background:#eaeaea;"
! scope="row" style="text-align:center" | 2017
| style="text-align:center" | 
| 46 || 22 || 30 || 12 || 236 || 121 || 357 || 96 || 64 || 1.4 || 0.5 || 10.7 || 5.5 || 16.2 || 4.4 || 2.9
|- class="sortbottom"
! colspan=3| Career
! 138
! 115
! 55
! 1387
! 1017
! 2404
! 533
! 452
! 0.8
! 0.4
! 10.1
! 7.4
! 17.4
! 3.9
! 3.3
|}

References

External links

  

1989 births
Living people
Adelaide Football Club players
North Adelaide Football Club players
Australian rules footballers from South Australia
Adelaide Football Club (SANFL) players
Carlton Football Club players